Michael Habeck (23 April 1944 – 4 February 2011) was a German actor who was best known for providing the German dubbing for Oliver Hardy after Bruno W. Pantel died.

Habeck, who was born in Bad Grönenbach, also dubbed several characters in the German version of The Muppet Show, and appeared in the films The Name of the Rose and Asterix in Amerika. Habeck died in Munich on 4 February 2011 after a short time of severe illness, aged 66.

Filmography

German-language Voice Acting

Source:

References

External links

Obituary

1944 births
2011 deaths
German male film actors
German male television actors
German male voice actors